BRW may refer to:

Transport 
Blairstown Railway, New Jersey, U.S.
Black River and Western Railroad, New Jersey, U.S.
Brunswick railway station, Liverpool, England
Wiley Post–Will Rogers Memorial Airport, Alaska, U.S.

Other uses 
BRW (magazine), a defunct Australian business periodical
BRW Rich 200, its annual rich list
Black and red ware, ancient pottery of South Asia